Nigel Plum is a journeyman Australian former professional rugby league footballer. He played for the Sydney Roosters, Canberra Raiders and Penrith Panthers in the National Rugby League. He was known for his tackling technique, most notably cutting the ball runner in half. He now works at Murrumbidgee Regional High School (Wade Campus) in Griffith, NSW

Playing career
Plum made his first grade debut for the Sydney Roosters against South Sydney in round 1 of the 2005 NRL season at the Sydney Football Stadium.

Plum was granted a release from his contract with the Sydney Roosters in 2007 and immediately signed with the Canberra Raiders.  In the 2008 NRL season, Plum played in Canberra's elimination final loss to Cronulla-Sutherland.

On 24 September 2009 it was announced that Plum had signed with the Penrith Panthers, but his first season with the Panthers was limited by numerous injuries and  Plum was restricted to performances in the Penrith Panthers' NSW Cup feeder side the Windsor Wolves. Plum returned to first grade in 2011 and was voted Big League Magazine's Hardest Hitter.

In the 2014 NRL season, Plum played nearly every match for Penrith as the club qualified for the finals and made it to within game of the 2014 NRL Grand Final but were defeated by Canterbury in the preliminary final at ANZ Stadium.

On 15 August 2015, Plum announced his retirement from the NRL effective immediately after the Panthers' round 23 win over the New Zealand Warriors. The round 23 win also marked his 150th NRL game.

References

External links
2015 Penrith Panthers profile

1983 births
Living people
Australian rugby league players
Canberra Raiders players
Penrith Panthers players
Rugby league locks
Rugby league players from Wagga Wagga
Rugby league props
Rugby league second-rows
Sydney Roosters players
Windsor Wolves players